Life Between the Waters is a 2017 Albanian-language drama film written, directed and produced by Albanian filmmaker Ardit Sadiku, in his debut feature, starring Jorida Meta, Kastriot Shehi and Enxhi Cuku. The narrative focuses on a middle-aged, working-class married couple, whose lives unravel when their daughter suddenly disappears. The film screened at the 2017 Tirana International Film Festival.

Plot
A disaffected mechanic and his unemployed wife experience days of uncertainty and fear after their teenage daughter suddenly disappears. Suspecting that she has run off with a stranger from the Internet, they begin a frantic yet futile search for her, receiving only perfunctory assistance from the local police. During the search, they are forced to recognize the deep sense of alienation that has separated them from their daughter and from one another.''

Cast

 Jorida Meta as Drita
 Kastriot Shehi as Agimi
 Enxhi Cuku as Ermela
 Klodian Hoxha as Iliri
 Ermela Ruri as Shpresa
 Simon Shkreli as Oficeri
 Lorenc Kaja as Bujari
 Gerald Sejdini as Silvani
 Elmaz Pepa as Mario

See also 
 Cinema of Albania

References

External links

2017 films
Albanian-language films
Films directed by Ardit Sadiku
Albanian drama films